An inventor is a person who creates or discovers new methods, means, or devices for performing a task.

Inventor may also refer to:

Inventor (patent), the legal term referring to the claimant of a patentable invention
Inventor (Role Variant), a psychological temperament or role, correlated with Myers-Briggs ENTP personality type
Open Inventor, a 3D graphics toolkit

Film
The Inventor (1981 film), a 1981 Swiss-German comedy drama film by Kurt Gloor.
The Inventor: Out for Blood in Silicon Valley, a 2019 American documentary film about Elizabeth Holmes and her former company Theranos
The Inventor (2023 film), an animated film about Leonardo da Vinci.

See also

The Inventors (disambiguation)
Inventory (disambiguation)
Invention (disambiguation)
List of inventors